Jessica Ashwood (born 28 April 1993) is an Australian competitive swimmer who was selected to represent Australia at the 2012 Summer Olympics in the 800-metre freestyle event, as well as the 2016 Summer Olympics.

Early life
Ashwood was born in Darlinghurst, New South Wales, on 28 April 1993. She is from the suburb of Padstow, Her grandmother is a swimming coach. She attended Regina Coeli Primary School before going to high school at MLC School.

Swimming
Ashwood is a swimmer, specialising in the 800-metre freestyle event. As a four-year-old, she started swimming. In 2012, she was training with Jayden Hadler, Daniel Arnamnart, James Magnussen and Daniel Tranter. She was coached by Jon Shaw from 2009 to 2010.  Brant Best became her coach in 2010 and was her coach from 2012 to 2014, and by Vince Raleigh since joining the Chandler Swimming Club in Queensland.

At a 2009 transtasman swimming meet, Ashwood beat Kiwi Phoebe Williams to finish first in the 800-metre freestyle event. At the 2009 Australian Youth Olympic Festival, she lost to Kelly Marquenie in the women's 800-metre freestyle event. She finished second in the women's 400-metre freestyle event. At the 2011 Queensland State Championships, she came in second in the women's 800-metre freestyle event, finishing seven seconds behind the winner. At the 2011 National Championships, with a time of 16:14.47, she finished second in the 1500-metre freestyle which secured her a spot on the national team going to the World Championships. At the 2011 World Swimming Championships, in her national team debut, she did not make it out of the semifinals in the 1,500-metre. At the 2011 Junior Pan Pacific Championships, she finished third in the 400-metre freestyle with a time of 4:12.47. At the 2012 Australian National Championships, she finished second in the women's 800-metre freestyle with a time of 8:27.97. As an 18-year-old, she was selected to represent Australia at the 2012 Summer Olympics in the 800-metre freestyle event in what were her first Games.

At the 2016 Summer Olympics, Ashwood represented Australia in both the 400m & 800m freestyle. She won a silver medal as part of the women's 4 × 200m freestyle team.

References

External links
 
 
 
 
 
 
 

1993 births
Living people
Australian female freestyle swimmers
Commonwealth Games silver medallists for Australia
Commonwealth Games medallists in swimming
Olympic swimmers of Australia
People educated at MLC School
Swimmers at the 2012 Summer Olympics
Swimmers at the 2014 Commonwealth Games
Swimmers at the 2018 Commonwealth Games
World Aquatics Championships medalists in swimming
Swimmers at the 2016 Summer Olympics
Olympic silver medalists for Australia
Medalists at the 2016 Summer Olympics
Olympic silver medalists in swimming
20th-century Australian women
21st-century Australian women
Medallists at the 2018 Commonwealth Games